W67DP, UHF analog channel 67, branded on-air as WNXG, was a low-powered television station licensed to Columbia, South Carolina, United States. The station was owned by WBHQ Columbia LLC, as part of a duopoly with MyNetworkTV affiliate WKTC (channel 63). W67DP's tower was located in Cayce, with plans for Time Warner Cable to pick up the station.

History

The station signed on as a translator of WKTC. On August 7, 2007, W67DP ceased broadcasting WKTC and became a Telemundo affiliate.

The station went dark in June 2010; on June 3, 2011, the Federal Communications Commission cancelled W67DP's license, due to inactivity. Telemundo programming continues on the second subchannel of WKTC.

References 

The State, Jul. 25, 2007, Telemundo to air for Columbia Hispanics
WIS, Jul. 25, 2007, Telemundo comes to the Midlands

67DP
Television channels and stations established in 1996
1996 establishments in South Carolina
Television channels and stations disestablished in 2011
2011 disestablishments in South Carolina
Defunct television stations in the United States
Defunct mass media in South Carolina
67DP